The canton of Avallon is an administrative division of the Yonne department, central France. Its borders were modified at the French canton reorganisation which came into effect in March 2015. Its seat is in Avallon.

It consists of the following communes:
 
Annay-la-Côte
Annéot
Athie
Avallon
Beauvilliers
Bussières
Chastellux-sur-Cure
Cussy-les-Forges
Domecy-sur-le-Vault
Étaule
Girolles
Island
Lucy-le-Bois
Magny
Menades
Pontaubert
Provency
Quarré-les-Tombes
Saint-Brancher
Sainte-Magnance
Saint-Germain-des-Champs
Saint-Léger-Vauban
Sauvigny-le-Bois
Sermizelles
Tharot
Thory
Vault-de-Lugny

References

Cantons of Yonne